Glyphostoma aguadillana is a species of sea snail, a marine gastropod mollusk in the family Clathurellidae.

Description
The shell grows to a length of 14 mm.

Distribution
This marine species occurs along Puerto Rico.

References

aguadillana
Gastropods described in 1901